The 2022–23 Ohio State Buckeyes men's basketball team represented Ohio State University in the 2022–23 NCAA Division I men's basketball season. Their head coach was Chris Holtmann, who was in his sixth season with the Buckeyes. The Buckeyes played their home games at Value City Arena in Columbus, Ohio as members of the Big Ten Conference. They finished the season 16–19, 5–15 in Big Ten play to finish in 13th place. They defeated Wisconsin, Iowa, and Michigan State in the Big Ten tournament to advance to the semifinals. There they lost to Purdue.

Previous season
The Buckeyes finished the 2021–22 season 20–12, 12–8 in Big Ten play to finish a three-way tie for fifth place. As the No. 6 seed in the Big Ten tournament, they lost to Penn State in the quarterfinals. They received an at-large bid to the NCAA tournament as the No. 7 seed in the South region where they defeated in Loyola in the First Round before losing to Villanova in the Second Round.

Offseason

Departures

Incoming transfers

Recruiting classes

2022 recruiting class

2023 recruiting class

Roster

Schedule and results

|-
!colspan=9 style=|Exhibition

|-
!colspan=9 style=|Regular season

|-
!colspan=9 style=|Big Ten tournament

Source

Rankings

*AP does not release post-NCAA Tournament rankings.

References

Ohio State Buckeyes men's basketball seasons
Ohio State
2022 in sports in Ohio
2023 in sports in Ohio